Parliamentary elections were held in Haiti on 9 August 2015, with a second round initially planned for 25 October. Two-thirds of the Senate and all members of the Chamber of Deputies were up for election.

International observers reported that early rounds of voting have experienced significant fraud, including people voting more than once due to failure of indelible ink, vote buying due to lack of secrecy, poor training of election workers, poor tracking of political parties, and other problems.

This has resulted in the nullification of some results and rescheduling of re-runs.  The second round of the parliamentary elections that had been scheduled for October 2015 was postponed to October 2016, along with the first round for a third of the Senate and the first round of a new presidential election. The United States withdrew funding for the October 2016 round, though it financially supported previous rounds and observers from the Organization of American States. The second round was scheduled for 9 October 2016 but was postponed to 20 November due to Hurricane Matthew. It was held together with local elections and the first round of the presidential election.

Electoral system
Members of the Chamber of Deputies are elected in single-member constituencies using the two-round system; a second round being held if no candidate in a constituency wins a majority of the vote in the first round. In March 2015 an electoral decree increased the number of members in the new Chamber of Deputies from 99 to 118, with the Senate retaining the 30 members. On 13 March, President Martelly issued a decree that split the Cerca La Source in two constituencies, and therefore increasing the number of deputies to 119.

One-third of the 30-member Senate is elected every two years, also using the two-round system. However, the previous Senate elections, which had been scheduled for May 2012, were not held, meaning two-thirds of the seats were up for elections in 2015.

The Haitian election calendar was as follows:

Campaign
A total of 2,037 candidates registered to contest the elections, representing 98 different political parties. However, 522 candidates were disqualified in a first instance, leaving 186 candidates for the Senate and 1,329 for the Chamber of Deputies. The Provisional Electoral Council updated the list of candidates on 26 June, with the inscription of 47 candidates for the Senate and 294 for the Chamber of Deputies that had been previously rejected, making a grand total of 233 candidates for senator and 1,624 for deputy.

The number of candidates among the principal parties are shown here:

On September 8, 2015, candidates of the Verité party withdrew from the elections.

Results

2015 results 
According to the preliminary results given by the Electoral Committee, there were 1,046,516 valid votes for an electorate of 5,871,450, which represents a 17.82% turnout. The elections were cancelled in 22 constituencies, and therefore there were no results for those districts.

On September 28 the Electoral Committee released definitive results, and declared elected one senator from AAA (Haiti in Action) and one from LIDE (Ligue Dessalines). For the deputies' election, 8 deputies were elected: 4 candidates from PHTK (Haitian Tèt Kale Party), 2 from AAA (Haiti in Action), 1 from VERITE (Truth) and 1 from INITE PATRIYOTIK (Patriotic Unity). The second round of the legislative election took place on October 25, along with the first round of the presidential election and the first round of the legislative election on the constituencies where the August election were cancelled.

The results of October 25 second round for the Senate says that were elected 3 candidates from KID, 3 from Verité, 2 from PHTK, and Fanmi Lavalas, PONT, OPL and Pettit Dessalines each had one. 82 deputies were elected in the second round. Eight more had already won in the first round on 9 August. The second round at the districts where the election was repeated should take place on 27 December, but on 21 December the Electoral Committee announced that the elections were postponed indefinitely.

2016 results 
According to Reuters, one of the elected Senators, Guy Philippe, participated in the overthrow of Jean-Bertrand Aristide and is wanted by the DEA for "conspiracy to import cocaine and launder monetary instruments". He campaigned with President-Elect Jovenel Moïse.

The total of deputies and senators elected until December 2016 is stated below. The table lists in separate columns the number of deputies elected in the second rounds made in 2015 and 2016, because some of the run-offs were delayed along with the presidential run-off.

Chamber of Deputies

Senate

List of elected senators

References

2015 in Haiti
2016 in Haiti
Elections in Haiti
Haiti
Haiti
Election and referendum articles with incomplete results